Loveless was an American Western comic book series for mature readers published by DC Comics as a part of that company's Vertigo imprint. It is written by Brian Azzarello and drawn by Marcelo Frusin, Danijel Zezelj and Werther Dell'Edera. There are 24 issues total.

Plot
Loveless was originally about a man, Wes Cutter, who fought for the South in the Civil War and was captured. After spending time in a prison camp he comes back to his previous home of Blackwater after the North won to find the town under Union control and his house occupied. Soon after, Cutter is offered a position of sheriff in the town.

The comic's early issues explore the dynamic relationship between Cutter and the people of the town (most of whom hate him), the fate of Cutter's wife Ruth, and the lingering feelings of animosity between North and South after the end of the war.

Since the conclusion to its earlier issues, Loveless has become a comic of greater chronological and thematic narrative. The stories within Loveless, since its inception and especially in its later years center around racism and the grittier realities of American history.

The book had been stated to last about four years by Brian Azzarello in a Broken Frontier interview. In the interview Azzarello also hinted to end the story in the 1940s or so, but the series was cancelled with issue #24.

Characters
Wes (Wesley) Cutter
Protagonist
Ruth Cutter (Stokes)
Takes the name of James Wright
Jonny Cutter
Brother of Wes Cutter
Smuggled weapons from Canada
Boyd Johnson
Fought along with Wes under Bill Anderson's command
'Bloody' Bill Anderson
Abram Rivers
Silas Redd.
Colonel
Crippled by Boyd Johnson and lost his leg
James Foley
Catholic, unlike most other soldiers
Promoted to sergeant
Irish
Jeremiah Trotter
George.
Sergeant
Killed by Ruth
Atticus Man
Black bounty hunter.
Lord
Referred as Captain, but probably holds higher position, since he dismisses colonel Redd of his duties
Punch
Assassin, hired by Abram to kill Seth, who's been spying for Lawson Company, and later Wes Cutter
Martha
Abram's Wife
Jasper
Later became a horse racer
Murphy
Sergeant
Helen
Convinced Ruth to help Jonny conceal smuggled weapons in her house
Found dead in her bed, her neck broken
Frank
Has a pig farm

Artists
The title was penciled and inked by three artists on a rotating schedule: Marcelo Frusin (#1-5, 9-10, covers), Danijel Zezelj (#6-8, 13-15, 22-24), Werther Dell'Edera (#11-12, 16-21). Frusin previously worked with writer Brian Azzarello for three years on Hellblazer. Zezelj also had a previous project with Azzarello: El Diablo, a western mini series, that in Azzarello's words "planted the seeds for Loveless".
All three artists have clearly distinct, recognizable styles, colorist Patricia Mulviill ensured a graphic continuity throughout the series.

Collected editions
They are being collected together into trade paperbacks as the run continues:

See also
 Western genre in other media

Notes

External links
DC's page for A Kin of Homecoming

2005 comics debuts
Vertigo Comics titles
Western (genre) comics
Comics by Brian Azzarello